The Metro station Central Railway serves Sofia Central Station on the Sofia Metro in Bulgaria. It opened on 31 August 2012. Bulgaria's PM Boyko Borisov and  the President of the European Commission Jose Manuel Barroso inaugurated the new section of the Sofia Metro, which was funded with EU money.

Interchange with other public transport
West side:
 Tramway service: 1, 3, 4, 6, 7, 12
 City Bus service: 60, 74, 77, 78, 82, 85, 101, 213, 214, 285, 305, 404, 413
 Railway service: All trains

East side:
 Tramway service: 1
 Regional Bus service: Anton, Dren, Dupnitsa, Karlovo, Klisura, Koprivshtitsa, Kostenets, Kyustendil, Mirkovo, Pernik 
 National bus service: All buses 
 International bus service: All buses

Gallery

See also
 Sofia Metro

References

External links

 Sofia Metropolitan (Official site)
 More info in Bulgarian
 SofiaMetro@UrbanRail
 Sofia Urban Mobility Center
 Sofia Metro station projects
 360 degree panorama from outside the station (west end)
 Sofia Metropolitan
 vijsofia.eu
 Project Slide 1
 Project Slide 2
 Project Slide 3

Sofia Metro stations
Railway stations opened in 2012
2012 establishments in Bulgaria